Yengi Kand (also Romanized as Yengī Kand and Yangi Kand; also known as Yengi Kand Abhar Rood and Yenkī Kandī) is a village in Dowlatabad Rural District, in the Central District of Abhar County, Zanjan Province, Iran. At the 2006 census, its population was 161, in 45 families.

References 

Populated places in Abhar County